The 2021–22 Danish Superliga (officially the 3F Superliga for sponsorship reasons) was the 32nd season of the Danish Superliga. Brøndby were the defending champions. The season began on 16 July 2021 and ended on 29 May 2022.

Teams
Lyngby Boldklub (relegated after two years in the top flight) and AC Horsens (relegated after five years in the top flight) finished the 2020–21 season in 11th and 12th place, respectively, and were relegated to the 2021–22 1st Division.

The relegated teams were replaced by 2020–21 1st Division champions Viborg FF, who returned after four years of absence, as well as the runners-up Silkeborg IF who returned after a one-year absence.

Stadia and locations

Personnel and sponsoring
Note: Flags indicate national team as has been defined under FIFA eligibility rules. Players and Managers may hold more than one non-FIFA nationality.

Managerial changes

Note

Regular season

League table

Results

Results by round

Championship round
Points and goals carried over in full from the regular season.

Relegation round
Points and goals carried over in full from the regular season.

European play-offs
The fifth-placed team of the championship round, advanced to a play-off match against the winning team of the relegation round. The winners earned a place in the Europa Conference League second qualifying round.

European play-off match

Season statistics

Top scorers and assists
 

Source: Soccerway

Awards

Annual awards

Team of the Year

References

External links
Superliga (uefa.com)

Danish Superliga seasons
Denmark
Superliga